The Daniel Cragin Mill, known in the twenty-first century as the Frye's Measure Mill, is a historic watermill established in 1858. The mill was added to the U.S. National Register of Historic Places in 1982.

See also
Hamblet-Putnam-Frye House, the Frye's summer residence west of the mill
National Register of Historic Places listings in Hillsborough County, New Hampshire

References

Sources
Adamowicz, Joe, The New Hiking the Monadnock Region: 44 Nature Walks and Day-Hikes in the Heart of New England, Publisher UPNE. Published 2007. 
Dell'Orto, Michael G. et al., Wilton, Temple, and Lyndeborough, Arcadia Publishing, Published 2003. 
Livermore, Abiel Abbot et al., History of the Town of Wilton, Hillsborough County, New Hampshire, Marden & Rowell Printers. Published 1888. Lowell, Massachusetts

External links

Frye's Measure Mill official website

Industrial buildings completed in 1817
Buildings and structures in Hillsborough County, New Hampshire
Industrial buildings and structures on the National Register of Historic Places in New Hampshire
Tourist attractions in Hillsborough County, New Hampshire
National Register of Historic Places in Hillsborough County, New Hampshire
Wilton, New Hampshire
Furniture manufacturers
Manufacturing companies based in New Hampshire